Anton Salabay (born 12 June 2002) is a professional Ukrainian football midfielder who plays for Kolos Kovalivka.

Career
Salabay is a product of the different youth sportive school systems from Kyiv and Kyiv Oblast and competed for these teams in the Ukrainian Youth Football League.

In August 2019 he joined the main-squad of a newly promoted Ukrainian Premier League side FC Kolos Kovalivka and made his debut for its in the home losing match against FC Dynamo Kyiv on 9 May 2021 in the Ukrainian Premier League as a second half-time substituted player.

References

External links
 
 

2002 births
Living people
Footballers from Kyiv
Ukrainian footballers
FC Kolos Kovalivka players
Ukrainian Premier League players

Association football midfielders